Iyabode Ololade Remilekun "Lola" Odusoga (previously Wallinkoski; born 30 June 1977 in Turku) is a Finnish model who won the Miss Finland contest in 1996.  In 1997, she won the crown of Miss Scandinavia.   On 17 June 1996 at the Miss Universe competition in Las Vegas, she was second-runner up. Her mother is Finnish and her father is Yoruba.

She is also an actress, known for Vares: Tango of Darkness (2012), Hilander-TV (2010) and 3 asiaa: Petri Nygård (2013).

Odusoga married Jarkko Wallinkoski on 12 August 2005. They have two children together: a daughter(born 2004) and a son (born 2006). After the couple divorced in 2015, she changed her last name back to her maiden name.

References

External links

  Short bio

1977 births
Finnish female models
Finnish people of Nigerian descent
Finnish people of Yoruba descent
Finnish LGBT rights activists
Living people
Miss Finland winners
Miss Universe 1996 contestants
People from Turku
Yoruba beauty pageant contestants
Yoruba female models
Finnish women activists